A barnacle is an arthropod belonging to the infraclass Cirripedia in the subphylum Crustacea.

Barnacle may also refer to:

 Barnacle (surname)
 Barnacle (slang), an electronic part manually installed onto a printed circuit board to correct a functional deficiency
 Seborrheic keratosis, a non-cancerous benign skin growth, known as the "barnacles of old age" 
 Barnacle (comics), a character from Marvel Comics 
 Barnacle, Warwickshire, a small hamlet in Warwickshire, England
 "Barnacles", a 2002 song by Ugly Casanova from Sharpen Your Teeth

See also 
 The Barnacle Historic State Park, a Florida State Park
 Barnacle goose, a species of bird
 Barnacle Boy, a SpongeBob SquarePants character